Raffaele Mertes (born 1959) is an Italian film director. He began as a cinematographer, with his first work being on the 1982 film Un gusto molto particolare. His first film as director was the made-for-TV biblical film Ester in 1998.

Filmography
 Esther (1999)
 Joseph of Nazareth (Giuseppe di Nazareth, 2000)
 Mary Magdalene (Maria Maddalena, 2000)
 The Apocalypse (San Giovanni - L'apocalisse, 2000)
 Judas (Giuda, 2001)
 Thomas (Tommaso, 2001)

References

Further reading

External links

Italian cinematographers
Italian film directors
1959 births
Living people